The 1969 UNLV Rebels football team was an American football team that represented the University of Nevada, Las Vegas as an independent during the 1969 NCAA College Division football season. In their second year under head coach Bill Ireland, the team compiled a record of 6–4.

Schedule

References

UNLV
UNLV Rebels football seasons
UNLV Rebels football